Brainwave entrainment, also referred to as brainwave synchronization or neural entrainment, refers to the observation that brainwaves (large-scale electrical oscillations in the brain) will naturally synchronize to the rhythm of periodic external stimuli, such as flickering lights, speech, music, or tactile stimuli.

As different conscious states can be associated with different dominant brainwave frequencies, it is hypothesized that brainwave entrainment might induce a desired state. Researchers have found, for instance, that acoustic entrainment of delta waves in slow wave sleep had the functional effect of improving memory in healthy subjects.

Neural oscillation

Neural oscillations are rhythmic or repetitive electrochemical activity in the brain and central nervous system. Such oscillations can be characterized by their frequency, amplitude and phase. Neural tissue can generate oscillatory activity driven by mechanisms within individual neurons, as well as by interactions between them. They may also adjust frequency to synchronize with the periodic vibration of external acoustic or visual stimuli.

The activity of neurons generate electric currents; and the synchronous action of neural ensembles in the cerebral cortex, comprising large numbers of neurons, produce macroscopic oscillations.  These phenomena can be monitored and graphically documented by an electroencephalogram (EEG). The electroencephalographic representations of those oscillations are typically denoted by the term 'brainwaves' in common parlance.

The technique of recording neural electrical activity within the brain from electrochemical readings taken from the scalp originated with the experiments of Richard Caton in 1875, whose findings were developed into electroencephalography (EEG) by Hans Berger in the late 1920s.

Neural oscillation and cognitive functions
The functional role of neural oscillations is still not fully understood; however they have been shown to correlate with emotional responses, motor control, and a number of cognitive functions including information transfer, perception, and memory. Specifically, neural oscillations, in particular theta activity, are extensively linked to memory function, and coupling between theta and gamma activity is considered to be vital for memory functions, including episodic memory.

Etymology

Entrainment is a term originally derived from  complex systems theory. The theory explains the way that two or more independent, autonomous oscillators with differing rhythms or frequencies, when situated in proximity where they can interact for long enough, influence each other mutually, to a degree dependent on coupling force. They then adjust until both oscillate with the same frequency.
Examples include the mechanical entrainment or cyclic synchronization of two electric clothes dryers placed in close proximity, and the biological entrainment evident in the synchronized illumination of fireflies.

Entrainment is a concept first identified by the Dutch physicist Christiaan Huygens in 1665 who discovered the phenomenon during an experiment with pendulum clocks: He set them each in motion and found that when he returned the next day, the sway of their pendulums had all synchronized.

Such entrainment occurs because small amounts of energy are transferred between the two systems when they are out of phase in such a way as to produce negative feedback. As they assume a more stable phase relationship, the amount of energy gradually reduces to zero, with systems of greater frequency slowing down, and the other speeding up.

The term 'entrainment' has been used to describe a shared tendency of many physical and biological systems to synchronize their periodicity and rhythm through interaction. This tendency has been identified as specifically pertinent to the study of sound and music generally, and acoustic rhythms specifically. The most familiar examples of neuromotor entrainment to acoustic stimuli is observable in spontaneous foot or finger tapping to the rhythmic beat of a song.

Brainwaves, or neural oscillations, share the fundamental constituents with acoustic and optical waves, including frequency, amplitude and periodicity. Consequently, Huygens' discovery precipitated inquiry into whether or not the synchronous electrical activity of cortical neural ensembles might not only alter in response to external acoustic or optical stimuli but also entrain or synchronize their frequency to that of a specific stimulus.

Brainwave entrainment is a colloquialism for 'neural entrainment', which is a term used to denote the way in which the aggregate frequency of oscillations produced by the synchronous electrical activity in ensembles of cortical neurons can adjust to synchronize with the periodic vibration of external stimuli, such as a sustained acoustic frequency perceived as pitch, a regularly repeating pattern of intermittent sounds, perceived as rhythm, or of a regularly rhythmically intermittent flashing light.

See also
 Beat (acoustics)
 Electroencephalography
 Neural oscillation

References

Further reading
 
 
 Thaut, M. H., Rhythm, Music, and the Brain: Scientific Foundations and Clinical Applications (Studies on New Music Research). New York, NY: Routledge, 2005.
 Berger, J. and Turow, G. (Eds.), Music, Science, and the Rhythmic Brain : Cultural and Clinical Implications.  New York, NY: Routledge, 2011.

External links
This is your brain on communication | Uri Hasson (TEDtalk)

Acoustics
Hearing
Neuroscience
Electroencephalography
Psychoacoustics
Meditation